Alcohol dehydrogenase 1B is an enzyme that in humans is encoded by the ADH1B gene.

The protein encoded by this gene is a member of the alcohol dehydrogenase family. Members of this enzyme family metabolize a wide variety of substrates, including ethanol (beverage alcohol), retinol, other aliphatic alcohols, hydroxysteroids, and lipid peroxidation products. The encoded protein, known as ADH1B or beta-ADH, can form homodimers and heterodimers with ADH1A and ADH1C subunits, exhibits high activity for ethanol oxidation and plays a major role in ethanol catabolism (oxidizing ethanol into acetaldehyde). The acetaldehyde is further metabolized to acetate by aldehyde dehydrogenase genes. Three genes encoding the closely related alpha, beta and gamma subunits are tandemly organized in a genomic segment as a gene cluster.

The human gene is located on chromosome 4 in 4q22.

Previously ADH1B was called ADH2. There are more genes in the family of alcohol dehydrogenase. These genes are now referred to as ADH1A, ADH1C, and ADH4, ADH5, ADH6 and ADH7.

Variants 
A single nucleotide polymorphism (SNP) in ADH1B is rs1229984, that changes arginine to histidine at residue 47 of the mature protein; standard nomenclature now includes the initiating methionine, so the position is officially 48. The 'typical' variant of this has been referred to as ADH2(1) or ADH2*1 while the 'atypical' has been referred to as, e.g., ADH2(2), ADH2*2, ADH1B*48His. This SNP is associated with the risk for alcohol dependence, alcohol use disorders and alcohol consumption, with the atypical genotype having reduced risk of alcoholism. The atypical genotype produces a more active enzyme and is associated with rice domestication.

Another SNP is rs2066702 [Arg370Cys]. originally called position 369. This SNP is at high frequencies in populations from Africa, and also reduces risk for alcohol dependence.

Role in pathology 
A marked decrease of ADH1B mRNA was detected in corneal fibroblasts taken from persons suffering from keratoconus.

See also 
Alcohol dehydrogenase
Aldehyde dehydrogenase

References

Further reading

External links